"Purple" is the fourth single from War of Angels, and is the ninth single overall from rock ensemble Pop Evil.  The video shares life on the road featuring videos from when the band was on tour.  The song is described as a highly melodic ballad.

Reception 
The song is described by Heavy Metal Now as being 'a mix between the cheesy pop metal balladry of "Let It Go", but with the better musicality found in the ballad "Monster You Made"'.

Chart performance

References 

2012 singles
Pop Evil songs
2011 songs
Songs written by Dave Bassett (songwriter)
Song recordings produced by Johnny K